Banishchi is a rural locality in Gustomoysky Selsoviet Rural Settlement, Lgovsky District, Kursk Oblast, Russia. Population:

Geography 
The village is located on the Seym River, 51 km from the Russia–Ukraine border, 76 km west of Kursk, 10 km north-west of the district center – the town Lgov, 6 km from the selsoviet center – Gustomoy.

 Climate
Banishchi has a warm-summer humid continental climate (Dfb in the Köppen climate classification).

Transport 
Banishchi is located 6 km from the road of regional importance  (Kursk – Lgov – Rylsk – border with Ukraine) as part of the European route E38, on the road of intermunicipal significance  (38K-017 – Banishchi – Pristen), 9 km from the nearest railway station Artakowo (railway line 322 km – Lgov I).

The rural locality is situated 83 km from Kursk Vostochny Airport, 155 km from Belgorod International Airport and 287 km from Voronezh Peter the Great Airport.

References

Notes

Sources

Rural localities in Lgovsky District